Lee Dong-eun (born 1978) is a South Korean film director and screenwriter.

Career 
Lee, an economics major at Sungkyunkwan University, is from Myung Films Institute's Film Directing major graduating class. He developed and produced his first feature film In Between Seasons (2016) in Myung Films Lab. In Between Seasons world premiered and won KNN Award at the 21st Busan International Film Festival. His second feature Mothers (2017) is based on his 2015 book Your Request - My Other Mother where the script also won the annual spring literary contest conducted by The Dong-a Ilbo newspaper.

Filmography

As director 
In Between Seasons (2016)
Mothers (2017)

As screenwriter 
In Between Seasons (2016)
Mothers (2017)

As producer 
In Between Seasons (2016)

As script coordinator 
Intruders (2013)

Production department 
The Customer Is Always Right (2006)
Love Phobia (2006)
Hanbando (2006)
Fly High (2006)
Puzzle (2006)
Radio Star (2006)
Righteous Ties (2006)
Project Makeover (2007)
A Good Day to Have an Affair (2007)
Soo (2007)
Secret Sunshine (2007)
Hwang Jin Yi (2007)Love Now (2007)Mission Possible: Kidnapping Granny K (2007)Shadows in the Palace (2007)Venus and Mars (2007)Crazy Waiting (2008)Hellcats'' (2008)

References

External links 
 
 

1978 births
Living people
South Korean film directors
South Korean screenwriters
Sungkyunkwan University alumni